William Henry Palmer (October 9, 1835 – July 14, 1926) was an officer in the Confederate States Army; serving in the Army of Northern Virginia during the American Civil War.

Biography
Palmer was born in Richmond, Virginia. Prior to the outbreak of the Civil War, he was a merchant there. When the Civil War began, Palmer joined the First Virginia Infantry Regiment as a private. At Williamsburg Palmer, by now a Major, took over command of the regiment when his colonel was wounded; however Palmer himself got shot in the arm. In October 1862, he joined the staff of Confederate General A.P. Hill. His shoulder was dislocated in the same friendly fire attack at Chancellorsville that mortally wounded Gen. Thomas "Stonewall" Jackson. Palmer spent the rest of the War with Hill, eventually rising to be the chief of staff for the Army of Northern Virginia's Third Corps.

Historian James Robertson, Hill's biographer, called Palmer "polished, highly organized, and indefatigable" as well as "Hill's most trusted aide." 

After Hill's death on April 2, 1865, Palmer served as an Assistant Adjutant-General (or AAG) on Gen. James Longstreet's staff. He was paroled at Appomattox.

After the War, Palmer returned to Richmond. He became president of an insurance company and a banker. He lived well into the 20th century. When he died in 1926 at age 90, he was buried in Richmond's Hollywood Cemetery.

External links

References

1835 births
1926 deaths
Military personnel from Richmond, Virginia
People of Virginia in the American Civil War
Confederate States Army officers
Burials at Hollywood Cemetery (Richmond, Virginia)